FC Bobruisk is a defunct Belarusian football club from Bobruisk. They disbanded in 1995.

History
The team was formed in late 1984 as Traktor Bobruisk. During Soviet years, they played in the Belarusian SSR league.

From 1992 until 1995, the team was playing in the Belarusian Premier League. In late 1992, they changed name to Fandok Bobruisk and 1995 to FC Bobruisk. After unsuccessful 1995 season, they finished last with only 2 points in 15 games. The team was disbanded.

Name changes
1984: Founded as FC Traktor Bobruisk
1992: Renamed to FC Fandok Bobruisk
1995: Renamed to FC Bobruisk

Honours
 Belarusian Cup
 Runners-up (1): 1994

League and Cup history

1 Withdrew before the first game.

European results
 Q = Qualification

References

External links
Profile at footballfacts
Severyanin, I. Fun and dok. How was disappearing the unique Babruysk club "Fandok" (Fun и док. Как исчезал самобытный бобруйский клуб «Фандоке»). Tribuna. 17 December 2013

Babruysk
Defunct football clubs in Belarus
Association football clubs disestablished in 1995
1995 disestablishments in Belarus
Association football clubs established in 1984
1984 establishments in Belarus